The 2019 EuroHockey Club Champions Cup was the 47th and last edition of the premier European competition for women's field hockey clubs. HC Den Bosch were the defending champions, having won their 16th title in the 2018 EuroHockey Club Champions Cup. The tournament took place from 19 to 22 April 2019 at the Wagener Stadium in Amstelveen, Netherlands.

Qualified teams
  Den Bosch
  Amsterdam
  Club an der Alster
  UHC Hamburg
  Real Sociedad
  Surbiton
  Grodno
  Loreto

Results

Bracket

Quarter-finals

Fifth to eighth place classification

Crossover

Seventh place game

Fifth place game

First to fourth place classification

Semi-finals

Third place game

Final

Statistics

Final standings

See also
 2018–19 Euro Hockey League

References

EuroHockey Club Champions Cup (women)
EuroHockey Club Champions Cup
International women's field hockey competitions hosted by the Netherlands
EuroHockey Club Champions Cup
EuroHockey Club Champions Cup
Sports competitions in Amstelveen
EuroHockey Club Champions Cup